Javier Mendoza may refer to:

 Javier Mendoza (boxer) (born 1991), Mexican boxer
 Javier Mendoza (footballer) (born 1992), Argentine footballer
 Javier Jose Mendoza (born 1978), Mexican American conductor